The 2019 Blackwater Elite season was the fifth season of the franchise in the Philippine Basketball Association (PBA).

Draft picks

Roster

Philippine Cup

Eliminations

Standings

Game log

|-bgcolor=ffcccc
| 1
| January 16
| NorthPort
| L 91–117
| Abu Tratter (18)
| Abu Tratter (9)
| Belo, Sumang (4)
| Smart Araneta Coliseum
| 0–1
|-bgcolor=ffcccc
| 2
| January 19
| Meralco
| L 94–99
| Allein Maliksi (17)
| Raymar Jose (10)
| Roi Sumang (9)
| Ynares Center
| 0–2
|-bgcolor=ccffcc
| 3
| January 30
| Rain or Shine
| W 111–99
| Michael DiGregorio (27)
| Chris Javier (13)
| Roi Sumang (8)
| Cuneta Astrodome
| 1–2

|-bgcolor=ffcccc
| 4
| February 1
| Phoenix
| L 95–114
| Abu Tratter (24)
| Mac Belo (9)
| Belo, Dario (4)
| Ynares Center
| 1–3
|-bgcolor=ffcccc
| 5
| February 6
| San Miguel
| L 79–93
| Roi Sumang (17)
| Maliksi, Tratter (12)
| Roi Sumang (6)
| Mall of Asia Arena
| 1–4
|-bgcolor=ffcccc
| 6
| February 9
| Barangay Ginebra
| L 67–85
| DiGregorio, Eriobu (14)
| Eriobu, Javier (8)
| Alolino, Belo, Desiderio, Sumang (3)
| Davao del Sur Coliseum
| 1–5
|-bgcolor=ffcccc
| 7
| February 13
| Alaska
| L 101–103
| Allein Maliksi (25)
| Jose, Maliksi (5)
| Roi Sumang (5)
| Mall of Asia Arena
| 1–6

|-bgcolor=ccffcc
| 8
| March 1
| Columbian
| W 106–100
| Allein Maliksi (29)
| Mac Belo (9)
| Maliksi, Sumang (5)
| Mall of Asia Arena
| 2–6
|-bgcolor=ffcccc
| 9
| March 9
| TNT
| L 89–127
| Michael DiGregorio (20)
| Rabeh Al-Hussaini (6)
| Maliksi, Sumang (4)
| Ynares Center
| 2–7
|-bgcolor=ffcccc
| 10
| March 17
| NLEX
| L 101–122
| Allein Maliksi (20)
| Abu Tratter (12)
| Diego Dario (9)
| Smart Araneta Coliseum
| 2–8
|-bgcolor=ffcccc
| 11
| March 22
| Magnolia
| L 87–97
| Belo, Maliksi (16)
| Abu Tratter (9)
| Banal, Dario (4)
| Ynares Center
| 2–9

Commissioner's Cup

Eliminations

Standings

Game log

|-bgcolor=ccffcc
| 1
| May 19
| Meralco
| W 94–91 (OT)
| DiGregorio, Stepheson (21)
| Alex Stepheson (31)
| Roi Sumang (3)
| Mall of Asia Arena
| 1–0
|-bgcolor=ccffcc
| 2
| May 24
| Barangay Ginebra
| W 108–107 (OT)
| Parks, Stepheson (28)
| Alex Stepheson (25)
| Roi Sumang (7)
| Smart Araneta Coliseum
| 2–0
|-bgcolor=ccffcc
| 3
| May 26
| Columbian
| W 118–110
| Alex Stepheson (26)
| Alex Stepheson (21)
| Bobby Ray Parks Jr. (5)
| Smart Araneta Coliseum
| 3–0
|-bgcolor=ffcccc
| 4
| May 31
| Phoenix
| L 98–103
| Bobby Ray Parks Jr. (25)
| Alex Stepheson (18)
| Mac Belo (4)
| Mall of Asia Arena
| 3–1

|-bgcolor=ccffcc
| 5
| June 2
| Rain or Shine
| W 98–92
| Allein Maliksi (19)
| Alex Stepheson (20)
| Roi Sumang (7)
| Ynares Center
| 4–1
|-bgcolor=ccffcc
| 6
| June 8
| NLEX
| W 132–106
| Bobby Ray Parks Jr. (29)
| Alex Stepheson (17)
| Parks, Stepheson (5)
| Ynares Center
| 5–1
|-bgcolor=ffcccc
| 7
| June 14
| San Miguel
| L 106–127
| Bobby Ray Parks Jr. (23)
| Bobby Ray Parks Jr. (13)
| Roi Sumang (5)
| Mall of Asia Arena
| 5–2
|-bgcolor=ffcccc
| 8
| June 22
| NorthPort
| L 99–127
| Bobby Ray Parks Jr. (25)
| Bobby Ray Parks Jr. (11)
| Michael DiGregorio (10)
| Cuneta Astrodome
| 5–3

|-bgcolor=ccffcc
| 9
| July 5
| Magnolia
| W 104–99 (OT)
| Roi Sumang (19)
| Staphon Blair (14)
| Roi Sumang (6)
| Mall of Asia Arena
| 6–3
|-bgcolor=ffcccc
| 10
| July 7
| TNT
| L 97–115
| Bobby Ray Parks Jr. (21)
| Staphon Blair (16)
| Bobby Ray Parks Jr. (5)
| Smart Araneta Coliseum
| 6–4
|-bgcolor=ccffcc
| 11
| July 14
| Alaska
| W 112–104
| Bobby Ray Parks Jr. (25)
| Blair, Parks (10)
| Bobby Ray Parks Jr. (8)
| Smart Araneta Coliseum
| 7–4

Playoffs

Bracket

Game log

|-bgcolor=ffcccc
| 1
| July 20
| Rain or Shine
| L 80–83
| Bobby Ray Parks Jr. (20)
| Greg Smith (19)
| Roi Sumang (7)
| Mall of Asia Arena
| 0–1
|-bgcolor=ccffcc
| 2
| July 23
| Rain or Shine
| W 100–96
| Greg Smith (31)
| Greg Smith (18)
| Allein Maliksi (4)
| Smart Araneta Coliseum
| 1–1
|-bgcolor=ffcccc
| 3
| July 25
| Rain or Shine
| L 83–85
| Belo, Parks (16)
| Greg Smith (18)
| Roi Sumang (5)
| Smart Araneta Coliseum
| 1–2

Governors' Cup

Eliminations

Standings

Transactions

Free agency

Trades

Preseason

Governors' Cup

References

Blackwater Bossing seasons
Blackwater Elite